This is a list of Internet radio stations, including traditional broadcast stations which stream programming over the Internet as well as Internet-only stations.

General

BBC

Radio France

Indian Internet Radios 
 Boxout.fm
 RadioJoyAlukkas.com

Sarawakian Internet Radios 
 Radio Free Sarawak

Raidió Teilifís Éireann

RAI – Radiotelevisione Italiana 
 Rai Radio Uno (News/Talk)
 Rai Radio Due (Adult contemporary music)
 Rai Radio Tre (Classical music)
 Rai Sender Bozen (in German language)
 Satelradio

Yle 
 YleX
 Yle Radio Suomi
 Yle X3M
 Yle Vega

Weather 
 AccuWeather

Current affairs 
 C-SPAN

Entertainment

Music

Terrestrial/satellite stations 
 BBC (see section above)
 CBC Radio Three
 Gaydar Radio
 Radio Caroline
 Sirius Internet Radio, the Internet radio product of Sirius Satellite Radio
 XM Radio Online, the Internet radio product of XM Satellite Radio

Community/public/campus/college/university stations

Religious stations 
 Jewish Rock Radio
 KLOVE
 Mormon Channel
 Vatican Radio
 Vision Radio Network (Australia)

Tourist/Park information stations 
 CFPE

Corporate owned stations

Audacy owned stations

Internet-only 

!
Internet
Radio stations